Grove Township is a township in Shawnee County, Kansas and part of the Topeka metropolitan area. The population was 473 at the 2000 Census.

History
Grove Township was organized in 1918.

Geography

Demographics
As of the 2000 Census, there were 473 people, 179 households, and 140 families residing in the township. The population density was 16 people per square mile. The racial makeup of the township was; White 96.8%, Black 0.8%, Native American 0.4%, Asian 0.8%, Other 0.4%.

In the township the median age for males was 36.1. The median age for females was 36.4.

Political districts
 Kansas's 2nd congressional district

References

1. Grove township, Shawnee County, Kansas (KS) Detailed Profile

Townships in Shawnee County, Kansas
Townships in Kansas